Debreceni Vasutas Sport Club is a professional Hungarian football club based in Debrecen, Hungary.

Key

Nemzeti Bajnokság I
 Pld = Matches played
 W = Matches won
 D = Matches drawn
 L = Matches lost
 GF = Goals for
 GA = Goals against
 Pts = Points
 Pos = Final position

Hungarian football league system
 NBI = Nemzeti Bajnokság I 
 NBII = Nemzeti Bajnokság II 
 NBIII = Nemzeti Bajnokság III 
 MBI = Megyei Bajnokság I 

Magyar Kupa
 F = Final
 SF = Semi-finals
 QF = Quarter-finals
 R16 = Round of 16
 R32 = Round of 32
 R64 = Round of 64
 R128 = Round of 128

UEFA
 F = Final
 SF = Semi-finals
 QF = Quarter-finals
 Group = Group stage
 PO = Play-offs
 QR3 = Third qualifying round
 QR2 = Second qualifying round
 QR1 = First qualifying round
 PR = Preliminary round

Seasons
As of 22 May 2022

Notes
 Note 1: autumn championship
 Note 2: 1945–46 Play-off competition of places 1–5 of both competitions. (matches against teams in "own" class not played anymore)
 Note 3: season was abandoned after four match days, and is not official
 Note 4: Keleti csoport (Eastern division)

References

External links

Debreceni VSC
Debreceni